Patrick J. (Pat) Casey is a biochemist and molecular pharmacologist and is a James B. Duke Professor of Pharmacology and Cancer Biology at Duke University School of Medicine. In 2005, he relocated to Singapore to help found the Duke-NUS Medical School Singapore, where he continues to serve as its Senior Vice Dean of Research.

Early life and education

Casey grew up on a family farm near Mitchell, S. Dakota. He received a B.A. in Biology and Chemistry from Augustana College in Sioux Falls, SD in 1978. After three years working as an analytical chemist at the James Ford Bell Technical Center in Minneapolis, he entered the PhD program in Biochemistry at Brandeis University, receiving his degree in 1986. Casey did postdoctoral training from 1986-1990 at the University of Texas Southwestern Medical Center with Alfred G. Gilman.

Career

Casey joined the faculty at Duke University in 1990 as an Assistant Professor of Pharmacology and Cancer Biology and Biochemistry. His primary areas of research are in the fields of lipid modifications of proteins and in G protein signaling in cancer.  Casey was the founding Director of the Duke Center for Chemical Biology, established to spearhead interdisciplinary research and training in the application of fundamental chemical principles to the study of biology and the basis of disease and therapies. Awards for his work include the Established Investigator Award from the American Heart Association in 1992 and the Amgen Award from the American Society of Biochemistry and Molecular Biology in 2000.  Casey was elected a Fellow of the American Association for the Advancement of Science in 2012, and received the Distinguished Faculty Award from the Duke Medical Alumni Association in 2018.

Casey relocated to Singapore In 2005 to spearhead the development of the Duke-NUS Medical School. As Senior Vice Dean of Research at Duke-NUS, he was the chief architect of the five Signature Research Programs at Duke-NUS: Cancer and Stem Cell Biology, Cardiovascular and Metabolic Disorders, Neuroscience and Behavioral Disorders, Emerging Infectious Diseases, and Health Services and Systems Research. Casey has also played multiple roles in the Singapore Biomedical Sciences Initiative, serving on advisory committees for the Agency for Science, Technology and Research (A*STAR), National Medical Research Council (NMRC) and National Research Foundation (NRF).

In recognition of his public sector service in Singapore, Casey was awarded the Public Administration Medal (Silver) at Singapore’s National Day ceremony in Aug. 2020. Casey was appointed to the Board of Directors of Legend Biotech in Dec. 2020.

Casey has also been very involved in training the next generation of scientists and clinician-scientists. He has trained numerous PhD, MD/PhD students and research fellows in his own lab, and has been involved in the development of several training programs. Casey was a founding member, and served as Director for 10 years, of Duke University’s Graduate Program in Molecular Cancer Biology, and led the development of a unique PhD Program in Integrated Biology and Medicine at Duke-NUS.

Select publications

Casey, P.J., Solski, P.A., Der, C.J., and Buss, J.E. (1989) p21ras is modified by a farnesyl isoprenoid.  Proc. Natl. Acad. Sci. USA  86:8323-8327.
Casey, P.J., Thissen, J.A. & Moomaw, J.F. (1991) Enzymatic modification of proteins with a geranylgeranyl isoprenoid.  Proc. Natl. Acad. Sci. USA  88:8631-8635.
Casey, P.J. (1995) Protein lipidation in cell signaling. Science 268:221-225.
Zhang, F.L. & Casey, P.J.  (1996) Protein prenylation:  Molecular mechanisms and biological consequences.  Annu. Rev. Biochem. 65:241-269.
Park, H.W., Boduluri, S.R., Moomaw, J.F., Casey, P.J. & Beese, L.S. (1997) Crystal structure of protein farnesyltransferase at 2.25 Å resolution. Science 275:1800-1804.
Meigs, T.E, Fields, T.A., McKee, D.D. & Casey, P.J. (2001) Interaction of Gα12 and Gα13 with the cytoplasmic domain of cadherin provides a mechanism for β-catenin release. Proc. Natl. Acad. Sci. USA 98:519-524.
Long, S.B., Casey, P.J. & Beese, L.S. (2002) Reaction path of protein farnesyltransferase at atomic resolution.  Nature 419:645-650.
Winter-Vann, A.M., Baron, R.A., Wong, W., Dela Cruz, J., York, J.D., Gooden, D., Bergo, M.O., Young, S.G., Toone, E.J. & Casey, P.J. (2005) A small molecule inhibitor of isoprenylcysteine carboxylmethyltransferase with antitumor activity in cancer cells.  Proc. Natl. Acad. Sci. USA 102:4336-4341.
Winter-Vann, A.M. & Casey, P.J. (2005) Post-prenylation processing enzymes as targets for development of anti-cancer therapeutics.  Nature Rev. Cancer 5:405-412.
Kelly, P., Moeller, B.J., Booden, M.A., Kasbohm, E.A., Madden, J.F., Der, C.J., Daaka, Y, Dewhirst, M.W., Fields, T.A. & Casey, P.J. (2006) The G12 family of heterotrimeric G-proteins promotes cancer invasion and metastasis.  Proc. Natl. Acad. Sci. USA 103:8173-8178.
Wang, M., Tan, W., Coolman, B., Zhou, J., Liu, S., & Casey, P.J. (2010) Inhibition of isoprenylcysteine carboxylmethyltransferase induces autophagic-dependent apoptosis and impairs tumor growth in hepatocellular carcinoma.  Oncogene 29(35):4959-4970.
Wang, M. & Casey, P.J. (2016) Protein prenylation: unique fats make their mark on biology.  Nat. Rev. Mol. Cell Biol. 17:110–122.

References

External links 
 

Living people
Duke University faculty
American biochemists
Year of birth missing (living people)